Priscilla as the name of a ship may refer to:

 , a classic oyster dredging sloop and U.S. National Historic Landmark berthed at the Long Island Maritime Museum at West Sayville, New York
 , the proposed designation for an auxiliary schooner acquired by the United States Navy in 1917 but never commissioned

Ship names